A quien corresponda (To Whom it may Concern) is an Argentine novel by Martín Caparrós. It was first published in 2008. The book is a combination of anecdotes, stories, and situations recalled by the protagonist, Carlos "el Gallego"(the Galician), in order to remember his partner, who was assassinated by the Argentinian military during the National Reorganization Process.

References

Spanish-language novels
2008 Argentine novels
Novels set in Argentina
Editorial Anagrama books